IntraText is a digital library that offers an interface while meeting formal requirements. Texts are displayed in a hypertextual way, based on a Tablet PC interface. By  linking words in the text, it provides Concordances, word lists, statistics and links to cited works. Most content is available under a Creative Commons license. It also offers publishing services that enable similar advantages.

The IntraText interface applies a cognitive ergonomics model based on lexical hypertext and on the Tablet PC or touch screen interface. It uses a set of tools and methods based on HLT (Human Language Technologies).

Publishing
IntraText is structured to create and make available high quality electronic editions, particularly in editorial, philological and linguistics aspects. IntraText editions can be published on the Internet, intranets or distributed on CD-ROM in several ways.

IntraText allows you to reproduce faithfully scholarly editions complete with footnotes (even when structured in several apparatuses), philological annotations, references to one or more different editions, differences between the author's lexicon and the lexicon of other authors, and several languages in the same text.

Finally, IntraText supports intra- and extra-textual links to citations.  Extra-textual citations are automatically linked once the cited work is made available in its IntraText edition.

IntraText allows to create text collections as a whole hypertext, for example the collected works of an author, corpora, etc. The IntraText collection creates a browsing system which preserves the identity of each collected text (author, title, structure, criteria for concordance reference) but unifies them through the concordances. In an IntraText collection, the Table of contents has two levels: the index of the works and, for each work, its own TOC.

Editorial procedures
The system that generates IntraText checks the text for several issues, according to a schema conceived to improve content quality and representation quality. In particular:

lexical control: the system displays words not matching a reference vocabulary and creates a specific check list.
footnote control: if the text has footnotes, the system verifies the correspondence between footnotes and references and creates a detailed report. This feature has been included as many IntraTexts have thousands of footnotes.
multimedia element control (e.g. pictures): if the text has multimedia elements, the system checks whether each multimedia element file is available and generates a detailed report.
references control: if a text links to other parts of the same text or links to other texts available in IntraText edition, the system checks the coordinates of each quotation (e.g.: "Mt I, 28"), listing them in a check list.

References

External links
 IntraText Digital Library

Computational linguistics
Digital library software